Charles William Lindstrom  (September 7, 1936 - September 29, 2021) was a former Major League Baseball catcher who played briefly for the Chicago White Sox during the 1958 season.  He is also the son of Baseball Hall of Famer Freddie Lindstrom.

Fifteen months later, he was in the Major Leagues, coming into the fifth inning of a game September 28, 1958 versus the Kansas City Athletics as a defensive replacement for Johnny Romano. The first pitch from pitcher Hal Trosky was fumbled by Lindstrom as a passed ball, but he settled down and did not make another error.

In his first at bat in the bottom of the sixth inning, Lindstrom led off with a walk, scoring on a double by Don Mueller.  Then, in the bottom of the seventh, he tripled, driving in Johnny Callison with another run.  He was on deck for a third plate appearance when Sammy Esposito struck out looking to end the White Sox' last offensive inning in a game they won 11-4. This would be Lindstrom's only Major League game, as he was sent down to the minor leagues the following season, never returning to the Major Leagues.

Lindstrom is one of only four players to hit a triple in their one and only MLB at bat, the others being Eduardo Rodríguez (1973), Scott Munninghoff (1980), and Eric Cammack (2000). And with a triple, a walk, a run, and a run batted in during two plate appearances, Lindstrom had one of the best one-game careers in the history of baseball, along with John Paciorek.

Lindstrom died on September 29, 2021, at the age of 85.

See also
List of second-generation Major League Baseball players

References

External links

Merron, Jeff, "The List: Baseball's one-hit wonders", ESPN.com
Lincoln College Athletics: Historical Coaching Records

1936 births
2021 deaths
Baseball coaches from Illinois
Baseball players from Chicago
Charleston ChaSox players
Charleston White Sox players
Chicago White Sox players
Colorado Springs Sky Sox (WL) players
Davenport DavSox players
Lincoln Chiefs players
Major League Baseball catchers
Northwestern Wildcats baseball players
Sportspeople from Chicago
New Trier High School alumni